Charles Leslie Dundas (1 November 1847 - 17 March 1932) was  an eminent Anglican priest in the late nineteenth and early twentieth centuries.

Biography
Born into an ecclesiastical family on 1 November 1847, he was educated at The King's School, Canterbury, and Brasenose College, Oxford. He was ordained in 1870.  After a curacy at St Peter’s, Bournemouth, he was Vicar of Charlton Kings from 1875 until his appointment as Dean of Hobart and Administrator of the Diocese of Tasmania, a post he accepted in 1885 and held for a decade. During this time he was recommended as a suitable candidate for the Bishopric of Tanzania, but was not appointed. After this he held incumbencies at Charminster  with Stratton; and then Milton Abbas. He was Archdeacon of Dorset from February 1902 to 1926, and a Canon Residentiary at Salisbury Cathedral from 1914 to 1928.

A Fellow of Jesus College, Oxford, he died on 17 March 1932.

Notes

 

1847 births
People educated at The King's School, Canterbury
Alumni of Brasenose College, Oxford
Fellows of Jesus College, Oxford
Archdeacons of Dorset
Deans of Hobart
1932 deaths